Zachary Thomas Verhoven (born August 17, 1998) is a Canadian professional soccer player who plays as a midfielder for Atlético Ottawa of the Canadian Premier League.

Early life
Verhoven played youth soccer with Surrey United SC from 2003 to 2009. In 2010, he joined Surrey Guildford United SC. He also played on the British Columbia provincial team. After being part of the Whitecaps Propects program from 2008 to 2010, he officially joined the Vancouver Whitecaps Academy in September 2011. After the Whitecaps released him at the U15 level, he returned to Surrey United where he played until he reached the U18 level.

University career
In 2016, Verhoven began attending the University of British Columbia, where he played for the men's soccer team. He scored his first goal on September 4, 2016 against the UNBC Timberwolves, while also recording two assists in a 3-1 victory. On November 2, 2018, Verhoven scored two goals and added an assist in a 7-0 victory over the UFV Cascades. With UBC, he won three consecutive Canada West Conference titles from 2016 to 2018.

Club career
In 2017 and 2018, he played with the TSS Rovers in the Premier Development League.

In November 2018, Verhoven was selected in the second round (ninth overall) of the 2018 CPL–U Sports Draft by Pacific FC of the Canadian Premier League. In April 2019, he signed a professional contract with the club. He scored his first professional goal on August 18, 2019, with a shot from just over the midfield line against York 9 FC. In his first season as a professional, he scored two goals and added three assists. After primarily playing a "super-sub" role during his two years with Pacific, he departed the club after the 2020 season, after he requested his release.

In April 2021, Verhoven signed with Atlético Ottawa. During the 2021 season, he was often deployed in a more defensive right back position, transitioning from his usually midfield position, filling in due to injuries to other players. He was nominated for the Capital City Supporters Group Player of the Season in his inaugural season with the club. In January 2022, he re-signed with the club for two more season, with an option for 2024. In June 2022, he scored game-winning goals in back-to-back matches on June 1 against Valour FC and June 5 against his former club Pacific FC. During his second season with the club, he suffered a couple of injuries which limited him to only 12 regular season appearances, but he did return in time for the playoffs, scoring his first playoff goal in the first leg of the semi-finals against Pacific FC, as Ottawa advanced to the championship final.

International career
In September 2021, it was reported that Fiji were interested in having Verhoven join the program ahead of their FIFA World Cup qualification campaign.

Career statistics

References

External links

1998 births
Living people
Association football midfielders
Canadian soccer players
Soccer people from British Columbia
Sportspeople from Burnaby
Sportspeople from Surrey, British Columbia
Canadian people of Fijian descent
UBC Thunderbirds soccer players
TSS FC Rovers players
Pacific FC draft picks
Pacific FC players
Atlético Ottawa players
USL League Two players
Canadian Premier League players
Vancouver Whitecaps Residency players